General Sir Richard Nelson "Windy" Gale,  (25 June 1896 – 29 July 1982) was a senior officer in the British Army who served in both world wars. In the First World War he was awarded the Military Cross in 1918 whilst serving as a junior officer in the Machine Gun Corps. During the Second World War he served with 1st Parachute Brigade and then the 6th Airborne Division during the D-Day landings and Operation Tonga in 1944. After the end of the conflict, Gale remained in the army and eventually, in 1958, succeeded Field Marshal The Viscount Montgomery as Deputy Supreme Allied Commander Europe.

Early life
Gale was born on 25 June 1896 in London, England, to Wilfred Gale, a merchant from Hull, and his wife Helen Webber Ann, daughter of Joseph Nelson, of Townsville, Queensland, Australia. The early years of his life were spent in Australia and New Zealand due to his father gaining employment in insurance, but the Gale family returned to England in 1906. He was educated at Merchant Taylors' School, Northwood, a foundation school in the City of London, gaining an average academic record but becoming a prolific reader. After this, he attended further education at Aldenham School in Hertfordshire. For a time, he was a boarder at King Edward VI School, Stratford-upon-Avon.

When Gale left Aldenham he wanted to become a British Army officer in the Royal Artillery, but did not possess the academic qualifications or physical grades required for entry into the Royal Military Academy, Woolwich. Instead Gale followed in his father's footsteps and gained employment as an insurance agent, but he rapidly grew to dislike the job; determined to enter the British Army, he attended regular physical training classes and studied hard to improve his academic grades.

First World War
When the First World War broke out in August 1914, Gale, only recently turned 18, was still below the medical standards required for a recruit and failed to join a Territorial Force unit in London. He finally gained entry to the Royal Military College, Sandhurst in the summer of 1915 and was commissioned into the Worcestershire Regiment as a second lieutenant on 22 December. When Gale joined the regiment, he put his name forward for a course on training with machine guns and was accepted, being transferred to the Machine Gun Training Centre at Grantham; there he discovered that he had not applied to join a course, but to actually join the Machine Gun Corps (MGC). Appointed to the MGC on 13 March 1916, in short order he was posted to the Western Front.

Gale was posted, in the summer of 1916, to the 164th Machine Gun Company, which was in support of the 164th (North Lancashire) Brigade of the 55th (West Lancashire) Division. With his company, he fought in the Battle of the Somme and, towards the end of the year, served in the Ypres Salient. He was promoted to the temporary rank of lieutenant on 1 November 1916, and to the substantive rank on 1 July 1917. He was next involved in the Capture of Wytschaete in June 1917 but was not involved in the Passchendaele offensive, as he was suffering from both mental and physical exhaustion, and was sent to England on leave, and diagnosed with pyorrhoea. He returned to service in January 1918, although now serving with the 126th Machine Gun Company of the 126th (East Lancashire) Brigade, part of the 42nd (East Lancashire) Division. Among the fellow officers in his new company was Major Edwin Flavell, who was to serve in Gales' later career. On 23 February the company merged into the 42nd Battalion, MGC. It was during his service as a subaltern in France that he won the Military Cross (MC). During the German spring offensive launched by the German Army in mid-March 1918, Gale was awarded his MC for 'conspicuous gallantry and devotion to duty'. The citation for the MC reads:

Soon promoted to captain, Gale continued to serve on the Western Front, taking part in the Hundred Days Offensive, until the end of the war on 11 November 1918.

Between the wars
When the war ended in November 1918, Gale volunteered to go to India in 1919, serving with the 12th Battalion, MGC where Captain John Harding was a fellow subaltern who, like Gale, was to attain the highest ranks in the army. However, in 1922 the MGC was disbanded and Gale reverted to serving with the Worcestershire Regiment, and served with the 3rd Battalion, Worcesters before that, too, was disbanded, with Gale transferring to the Machine Gun School in India. In 1928 he joined the 1st Battalion, Worcesters. During his time in India he gained entry to the Staff College, Quetta, attending from 1930 to 1931, and after two years in the institution he graduated as a staff officer. Promotion prospects during the interwar years were limited, and although he received above average grades in his annual reports, he remained a subaltern for fifteen years, until he was promoted to the rank of captain in the Duke of Cornwall's Light Infantry (DCLI) on 26 February 1930.

In February 1932, Gale was seconded for service as a General Staff Officer Grade 3 (GSO3) in India. He was appointed a brigade major on 1 January 1934. Gale left India in January 1936 and returned to England to serve with the DCLI, receiving a brevet promotion to major on 1 July. In February 1937 he was transferred to the War Office as a GSO2, with responsibilities for the creation of training pamphlets and publications. He transferred to the Royal Inniskilling Fusiliers on 13 October. In December 1938 he was promoted to major and moved to the Staff Duties (Planning) section of the General Staff at the War Office.

Second World War

1940−1942
By December 1940 Gale, who had not seen service with the British Expeditionary Force (BEF) in France and Belgium, had been promoted to the acting rank of lieutenant-colonel and, wishing for a field command, was given command of the 2/5th Battalion, Leicestershire Regiment, a second-line Territorial Army (TA) unit that was part of Brigadier Gerard Bucknall's 138th Infantry Brigade, itself part of the 46th Infantry Division, then commanded by Major-General Charles Hudson, which had fought with the BEF. The battalion, along with the rest of the division, was serving in Scotland, reforming after having sustained very severe casualties in France, before moving to East Anglia in January 1941. Then, in the summer of 1941, the 1st Parachute Brigade was formed as part of the expansion of the British Army's newly created airborne forces, and Gale was offered command of the brigade by General Sir Alan Brooke, the Commander-in-Chief, Home Forces (and soon to be Chief of the Imperial General Staff/CIGS), who was impressed with the high morale and standards in Gale's battalion; he accepted the command. In late October the 1st Airlanding Brigade, under Brigadier George Hopkinson, along with the 1st Parachute Brigade, under Gale, were assigned to the newly created 1st Airborne Division, whose first General Officer Commanding (GOC) was Major-General Frederick "Boy" Browning.

February 1942 saw Operation Biting, perhaps better known as the Bruneval Raid, take place, in which Major John Frost's 'C' Company of the 2nd Parachute Battalion, of Gales' 1st Para Brigade, was selected to participate. The raid was very successful, with the objective – to seize equipment from a German radar station in France – being achieved, although there were casualties. Frost would later command the battalion, most notably in the Battle of Arnhem, in September 1944.

After a period spent organizing the brigade, choosing officers and devising new training schemes, Gale, by now a war-substantive lieutenant-colonel, was posted to the War Office in April 1942 as Deputy Director of Staff Duties (DDSD), and subsequently promoted to Director of Air. Gale's remit as Director of Air was to attempt to formulate a clear policy about the use of airborne forces between the army and the Royal Air Force (RAF), as well as to solve the aircraft shortages that stymied many attempts to conduct further airborne operations. There was a great deal of rivalry between the two services, with the RAF sure that large-scale bombing would win the conflict, and therefore unwilling to transfer any aircraft to the army for use by airborne forces.

1943−1944
In May 1943, Gale was promoted to the acting rank of major-general and became GOC of the newly formed 6th Airborne Division. Gale had just under a year to organize and train the division before it was due to participate in Operation Tonga, codename for the British airborne landings in Normandy, in June 1944. The division was initially understrength due to trained British airborne troops being transferred to North Africa and Sicily to replace the very heavy losses suffered by the 1st Airborne Division (now commanded by Hopkinson, succeeding Browning) during its operations, but it was soon expanded with the arrival of the 1st Canadian Parachute Battalion, joining the 3rd Parachute Brigade, under Brigadier James Hill, as well as the formation of the 5th Parachute Brigade, under Brigadier Nigel Poett, and the 6th Airlanding Brigade, under Brigadier Hugh Kindersley. No British airborne division had ever been deployed into battle entirely through aerial means, and devising plans and formulating tactics for the operation placed a great deal of pressure on Gale.

However, Gale's thoroughness paid off when the division successfully landed in Normandy in June 1944. For his part in planning and taking part in Operation Tonga, Gale was awarded the Distinguished Service Order (DSO) on 29 August 1944; in May, he had been promoted to colonel (war-substantive), and also to the temporary rank of major-general. The plan for the Allied invasion of Normandy was for five Allied divisions (two US, two British and one Canadian) to land on designated beaches between Varreville in the west, on the Cotentin Peninsula, and Ouistreham, by the mouth of the river Orne, in the east. Airborne troops were to secure each flank of the beachhead, with the US 82nd and 101st Airborne Divisions landing on the western flank, and the British 6th Airborne Division, under Gale, on the eastern flank. The 6th Airborne Division was to capture a number of bridges over the river Orne and the Caen Canal and hold the nearby surrounding areas, to destroy the bridges over the river Dives, and, finally, to destroy the Merville Gun Battery by the coast.

Shortly after midnight on 6 June 1944, known otherwise as D-Day, men of Major John Howard's 'D' Company of the 2nd Battalion, Oxfordshire and Buckinghamshire Light Infantry (2 OBLI), a glider infantry unit forming part of the 6th Airlanding Brigade, landed in glider and captured the Caen canal and Orne river bridges (now known as Pegasus Bridge and Horsa Bridge) via coup de main. It was achieved with light casualties. The two parachute brigades, the 3rd and 5th, landed soon after and landed, for the most part, where intended, although numbers of paratroopers dropped in the flooded countryside. The Merville Gun Battery also fell, although with heavy losses to Lieutenant-Colonel Jock Pearson's 8th Parachute Battalion. At dawn, Gale himself landed in Normandy by a glider piloted by Billy Griffith. By midday on D-Day elements of Brigadier Lord Lovat's 1st Special Service Brigade had landed at Sword Beach, with the British 3rd Infantry Division following, and began to relieve the airborne troops at the bridges. The arrival of the rest of the 6th Airlanding Brigade in the evening, in Operation Mallard, completed the 6th Airborne Division's concentration in Normandy.

The next week saw the 6th Airborne Division, serving as part of Lieutenant-General John Crocker's I Corps, engaged in almost constant fighting, notably at Bréville, in an attempt to prevent the Germans from driving the Allies back into the sea. After mid-June, when German counterattacks ceased, the division, reinforced by the 1st and 4th Special Service Brigades, spent the next two months in a static defence role, holding a nine thousand yard front southwards from the sea. In mid-August, with the situation in Normandy turning against the Germans and forcing them to withdraw to Falaise, the division was ordered to go over to the offensive and pursued to the Germans to the Seine, in nine days advancing some 45 miles, capturing 400 square miles of enemy territory and over 1,000 German soldiers, despite the belief of Crocker, the corps commander, and Gale himself, that the division was poorly equipped for a rapid pursuit.

1944−1945
On 5 September the division was taken out of the front lines, after almost exactly three months since landing in Normandy, and returned to for rest and recuperation, after sustaining almost 4,500 casualties. Soon after returning to England the 6th Airborne Division's sister formation, the 1st Airborne Division, then under Major-General Roy Urquhart, took part in Operation Market Garden, which Gale believed was doomed to failure from the start. In December Gale handed over command of the division to Major-General Eric Bols and was appointed to the headquarters of the First Allied Airborne Army (FAAAA), becoming deputy to the American commander, Lieutenant General Lewis H. Brereton. Planning then began for Operation Varsity, the airborne landings in support of Operation Plunder, the Allied crossing of the river Rhine. The operation was carried out in late March 1945 by the US XVIII Airborne Corps, under Major General Matthew Ridgway, with the British 6th and US 17th Airborne Divisions participating, and, although the operation was successful, both divisions suffered very heavy casualties and the need for the operation was questionable.

In the last months of the war in Europe, Gale was given command of I Airborne Corps. He was promoted to major-general on 7 January 1945, with the acting rank of lieutenant-general from 24 May. In July, after Victory in Europe Day (VE-Day), Gale, with the corps HQ, was sent to India, where the Japanese were still fighting. In India Gale took elements of his old 6th Airborne Division under command, along with the 44th Indian Airborne Division, and planning began for airborne operations in the Far East, although the surrender of Japan cancelled these plans and the war came to an end.

Later life

On 4 December 1946, Gale was promoted to the substantive rank of lieutenant-general. In January 1946, shortly after I Airborne Corps was disbanded, Gale became GOC of the 1st Infantry Division, succeeding Major-General Charles Loewen, then stationed in Egypt before, in March, being sent to Palestine, where there were tensions between the Jews and the Arabs, and commanded the division throughout the Palestine Emergency. Gales' division, serving under British Forces in Palestine and Trans-Jordan, commanded by Lieutenant-General Sir Evelyn Barker (later replaced by Lieutenant-General Sir Gordon MacMillan), was responsible for northern Palestine, with his old 6th Airborne Division, now commanded by Major-General James Cassels, responsible for southern Palestine. Gale relinquished command of the division to Major-General Horatius Murray in December 1947 and, in January 1948, he was appointed GOC British Troops in Egypt, succeeding Lieutenant-General Sir Charles Allfrey. Then in 1949, after handing over the command to Lieutenant-General George Erskine, he was transferred and became Director-General of Military Training. Gale was promoted to general on 6 June 1952, eight years after he landed in Normandy, and appointed Commander-in-Chief (C-in-C), Northern Army Group, Allied Land Forces Europe and British Army of the Rhine (BAOR), succeeding General Sir John Harding, on 24 September; he held the post until retiring in 1957, in turn handing over BAOR to General Sir Dudley Ward.

Gale initially retired in 1957, but in September 1958 he was recalled to serve with NATO and replaced Field Marshal Sir Bernard Montgomery as Deputy Supreme Allied Commander, Europe; he retired permanently in September 1960 after two years in the post and was replaced by General Sir Hugh Stockwell. During the post-war years, Gale also held a number of ceremonial and non-military posts; he was aide-de-camp (general) to the Queen Elizabeth II between 1954 and 1957, Colonel of the Worcestershire Regiment between 1950 and 1961, and Colonel-Commandant of the Parachute Regiment between 1956 and 1967.

Gale died at his home in Kingston upon Thames on 29 July 1982, just four days after his 86th birthday. His widow, Daphne (whom he married in 1924), subsequently lived in a grace and favour apartment in Hampton Court Palace until she died during a major fire at the palace in March 1986.

Military thinking
Gale's approach to military affairs emerged from both his personal history and personality. Gale, a 'tall, bluff, ruddy' individual, with a reputation as 'a bit of a buccaneer' but allegedly possessing a 'hectoring manner and a loud voice', was one of a number of First World War veterans to challenge the military status quo that had led to the terrible losses on the Western Front. Events such as the losses in the Battle of the Somme in 1916 heavily influenced Gale's thinking, and he emerged from the war with a suspicion of predominantly firepower-led operations. Looking back, Gale was to remember the 'wonderful panorama' of the infantry successfully advancing using modern infiltration tactics on a clear day in the spring of 1918, contributing to his embracing the interwar manoeuvrist theorists during his time at the Staff College, Quetta in the early 1930s. Gale saw a narrative in the sequence of developments from the creation of the new infantry tactics of 1918, through to the tanks and airborne forces of the 1940s, that demonstrated the 'fundamental necessity of mobility on the battlefield', and the importance of surprise at all levels of warfare.

During the Second World War, Gale applied these principles to the development of airborne forces. An advocate of shock manoeuvre with elite forces, Gale stressed extensive training, the use of the latest battlefield technologies and strong personal leadership. For Gale, the quality of one's military forces were as important as their number, and he drew additional lessons on the disproportionate effect that surprise manoeuvre had on a "demoralised or unprepared enemy", as opposed to a 'well-trained opposition', from the operations of his own 6th Airborne Division in Normandy. Later in life, Gale examined the issues of war in the nuclear age. Still an advocate of manoeuvre and high-quality forces, Gale was to stress the importance of achieving mobility and flexibility in the face of the Soviet threat, foreshadowing in many ways the evolution of the AirLand battle doctrine of the 1980s.

Honours and awards
Knight Grand Cross of the Order of the Bath – 1954 (KCB – 1953; CB – 2 August 1945)
Knight Commander of the Order of the British Empire – 1950 (OBE: 11 July 1940)
Distinguished Service Order 31 August 1944
Military Cross – 1918
Mention in Despatches – 22 March 1945, 7 January 1949
Commander of the Legion of Merit (USA) – 16 January 1948 (Officer – 20 June 1944)
Commandeur de la Légion d'honneur (France) – 28 December 1956
Croix de Guerre with Palm (France) – 28 December 1956
Grand Officier de la Couronne (Belgium)

Publications
With the 6th Airborne Div in Normandy (Sampson Low, Marston & Co, London, 1948)
Infantry in Modern Battle: Its Organization and Training (Canadian Army Journal 8, no. 1, 1955: 52–61)
Generalship and the art of Command in this Nuclear Age (RUSI Journal 101, no. 603, 1956: 376–384)
Call to arms. An autobiography (Hutchinson, London, 1968)
Great battles of biblical history (Hutchinson, London, 1968)
The Worcestershire Regiment, the 29th and 36th Regiments of foot (Leo Cooper, London, 1970)
Kings at arms: The Use and Abuse of power in the Great Kingdoms of the East (Hutchinson, London, 1971)

References

Bibliography

Gale, Richard (1955). Infantry in Modern Battle: Its Organization and Training, (Canadian Army Journal 8, no. 1, 1955: 52–61)
Gale, Richard (1956). Generalship and the art of Command in this Nuclear Age, (RUSI Journal 101, no. 603, 1956: 376–384)

External links

British Army Officers 1939−1945
Generals of World War II

|-

|-

|-

|-

|-

|-

1896 births
1982 deaths
British Army generals of World War II
British Army personnel of World War I
British military personnel of the Palestine Emergency
Companions of the Distinguished Service Order
Commanders of the Legion of Merit
Commandeurs of the Légion d'honneur
Duke of Cornwall's Light Infantry officers
Graduates of the Royal Military College, Sandhurst
Graduates of the Staff College, Quetta
Grand Officers of the Order of the Crown (Belgium)
Knights Commander of the Order of the British Empire
Knights Grand Cross of the Order of the Bath
Machine Gun Corps officers
Military personnel from London
NATO military personnel
People educated at King Edward VI School, Stratford-upon-Avon
People from Wandsworth
Recipients of the Croix de Guerre (France)
Recipients of the Military Cross
Royal Inniskilling Fusiliers officers
War Office personnel in World War II
Worcestershire Regiment officers